Ebenator Ekwe is an autonomous community in Ekwe Community in Isu Local Government Area of Imo State, Nigeria. It comprises Eluama, Umuokorokoro and Umuduruewuru villages and several kindreds.

References

Communities in Igboland
Towns in Imo State